HTC S730, also known as HTC Wings is a smartphone from HTC. The phone is a member of HTC's line with phones equipped with QWERTY-keyboards.

History
The phone was made available in late 2007. It uses Windows Mobile technology and is powered by Windows Mobile 6 Standard.

HTC has used slogans such as "Let's get down to business." and "Keep in touch no matter where you are in the world." when marketing the device.

Properties

Keyboard
The device has an extendable keyboard - "qwerty", available in localized versions, which simplifies SMS and smartphone functions. There's also a standard numeric keyboard located under the screen.

Multimedia
The device can also act as a music player supporting formats such as MP3, WMA, AAC, AAC+, eAAC+, WAV, QCELP, MPEG4, AMR-NB and AMR-WB.

Internet
The device can be connected to wireless networks using 802.11 b/g (WLAN), it supports the Skype-protocol which can be used to make calls when connected to a wireless network.

Battery
The device uses a 1,050 mAh rechargeable Li-Ion Polymer battery.

Rumours

Integrated GPS system
The device is said to contain a GPS chip but lacks the software to use it; also, the integrated GPS chip has no antenna and therefore it can only connect to 1-2 satellites (usually at COM4 at 4800 or 9600 baud). HTC has not officially stated that the device would contain any GPS functionality, however GPS functions have been demonstrated by HTC on preview versions of the device.

See also
High Tech Computer Corporation, a Taiwan-based manufacturer of handheld devices

References
HTC's product catalogue
The Swedish magazine Mobil - 2007/11

External links
Product Homepage
Product Specifications

S730
Windows Mobile Standard devices
Mobile phones introduced in 2007